Campsie is a civil parish in East Dunbartonshire, Scotland. The parish was formerly part of Stirlingshire.

Settlements
Auchenreoch
Clachan of Campsie
Haughhead
Lennoxtown
Milton of Campsie
Torrance
Baldernock (at one time the parish encompassed the parish of Baldernock)

See also
 Campsie Fells

References

External links
http://www.walkhighlands.co.uk/glasgow/campsies.shtml

Geography of East Dunbartonshire
Stirlingshire